Kristin Carson-Chahhoud is an Associate Professor at the University of South Australia, heading a research group in the Adelaide Medical School. Specialising in respiratory medicine, tobacco control and management of tobacco-related illnesses, Carson aims to close the gap between clinical research trials and real-world patient care.

Education 
After completing a Certificate III in Laboratory Skills in 2004 and a Diploma in Laboratory Technology (Pathology Testing) in 2007 at TAFE SA, Carson completed a Doctor of Philosophy in Medicine (PhD) in 2015 at the University of Adelaide. Her PhD thesis was titled "Advancing treatment options for tobacco cessation, prevention and related illnesses, with particular reference to Indigenous populations" and was completed while working full-time for SA Health as one of their youngest Senior Medical Research Scientists. Carson's thesis was awarded the Dean's Commendation for Doctoral Thesis Excellence. In 2015 Carson was awarded the Master of Science in Public Policy and Management Scholarship and completed a Master of Science in Public Policy and Management (MSPPM) at Carnegie Mellon University in 2016. She has been supported as an NHMRC/Cancer Australia TRIP Fellow as well as with project grants from the NHMRC.

Awards and prizes 
Carson has been awarded the 2021 Eureka Prize for Emerging Leader in Science for her work on lung health. Carson is recognised by ExpertScape as being in the top 1.3% of experts worldwide on smoking. 

Carson has also been awarded:

 2021 Recognised as one of SA's Top 40 under 40 Entrepreneurs and Business Leaders
 2019 James McWha Rising Star Award awarded by The University of Adelaide
 2016 Ann Woolcock Young Investigator Award awarded by The Thoracic Society of Australia and New Zealand 
 2015 Ross Wishart Memorial Award recipient at the Australia Society of Medical Research South Australia annual scientific meeting
 2015 Named one of the Australian Financial Review and Westpac 100 Women of Influence
 2015 South Australian Tall Poppy awarded by The Australian Institute of Policy and Science and the Tall Poppy Campaign
 2015 Young Australian of the Year for South Australia
 2014 Premier’s Channel 9 Young Achiever of the Year

Research 

Carson's research focuses on lung health, especially in tobacco-related illnesses, tobacco control and respiratory medicine. Carson's work in translational health research and evidence-based medicine and producing evidence through Cochrane systematic analyses, qualitative research and multi-centre randomised controlled trials, show her commitment to a smoke-free Australia. Her research leadership has allowed her to link research findings with real-world patient care to benefit the broader community. Carson uses innovative augmented reality technology (including holographic technology and virtual reality) to disrupt health communication and deliver evidence-based medicine. Carson has published over 95 papers, contributed to patient care, policy and practice both locally and internationally, and advised governments on plain packaging, tobacco-related legislation and lung health. 

After completing her PhD, Carson was a Postdoctoral Research Fellow at the University of Adelaide from 2015-2018. In 2018, Carson was appointed Associate Research Professor at the University of South Australia. Carson is a Research Fellow with the South Australian Health and Medical Research Institute (SAHMRI) and leads the Translational Medicine and Technology research group in the Australian Centre for Precision Health. Carson's has conducted research in partnership with the Asthma Foundation of South Australia and has received funding from the NHMRC and Cancer Australia.

Media 
Carson has provided expert comment on e-cigarettes and vaping in Vice and on 2SER radio. She has published in The Conversation on smoking in Indigenous communities and the tobacco giant John Morris acquiring a health company. Carson's team's research on using augmented reality to alleviate symptoms of anxiety and improve asthma control in children was reported on Channel 7 news. Carson has discussed her work on training health professionals to help people quit smoking and physical training for asthma on the Cochrane podcast.

References 

Living people
Australian women scientists
Women medical researchers
University of Adelaide alumni
Academic staff of the University of South Australia
Year of birth missing (living people)